Chang Wen-Chung (born 17 April 1968) is a Taiwanese baseball player who competed in the 1992 Summer Olympics.

He was part of the Chinese Taipei baseball team which won the silver medal. He played as outfielder.

External links
profile

1968 births
Living people
Baseball players at the 1992 Summer Olympics
Jungo Bears players
Olympic baseball players of Taiwan
Olympic silver medalists for Taiwan
Sinon Bulls players
Uni-President Lions players
Fu Jen Catholic University alumni
Olympic medalists in baseball
Medalists at the 1992 Summer Olympics
Baseball players from Tainan
Sinon Bulls managers